The 1943 Tschammerpokal was the 9th season of the annual German football cup competition. It was the last time the tournament was held. After the war it was reconstituted as the DFB-Pokal. 32 teams competed in the final tournament stage of five rounds. In the final held on 31 October 1943 in the Adolf-Hitler-Kampfbahn (Stuttgart) First Vienna FC defeated LSV Hamburg 3–2 after extra time.

Matches

Qualification round

First round

Round of 16

Quarter-finals

Semi-finals

Final

References

External links
 Official site of the DFB 
 Kicker.de 
 Tschammerpokal at Fussballberichte.de 

1943
1943 in German football cups